Phil O'Shea is an English screenwriter, director and producer. He has written and directed films starring Jude Law and Billie Piper.

Filmography 
 The Crane, director and writer
 Vampire Diary, co-director and writer
 Spirit Trap, writer
 Dream Team (TV series), writer
 Wycliffe (TV series), writer
 Stig of the Dump (BBC TV Series - BAFTA award), writer: script polish
 Yellowthread Street, writer
 Chuggington, writer
 Oscar Charlie, writer

External links 

 Phil O'Shea - screenwriter, director, producer

Living people
Year of birth missing (living people)
English screenwriters
English male screenwriters
English film directors
English film producers